A theory of value is any economic theory  that attempts to explain the exchange value or price of goods and services. Key questions in economic theory include why goods and services are priced as they are, how the value of goods and services comes about, and—for normative value theories—how to calculate the correct price of goods and services (if such a value exists).

History 
A major question that has eluded economists since the earliest of publications was one of price. As commodities began to be exchanged for currency, economic thinkers have constantly been trying to decipher how prices are determined. “Value” was the general term used to indicate the relative price of a good or service. One of the earliest predecessors of classical views on value theory comes from a pamphlet that was published in 1738. In this pamphlet, it is discussed how labor is the most important measurement tool when considering value. This idea stemmed from pre-monetary views of price, where labor was exchanged for other labor services. While this was an accepted idea, it was not without its critics.

Adam Smith agreed with certain aspects of labor theory of value, but believed it did not fully explain price and profit. Instead, he proposed a cost-of-production theory of value (to later develop into exchange value theory) that explained value was determined by several different factors, including wages and rents. This theory of value, according to Smith, best explained the natural prices in the market. While an underdeveloped theory at the time, it did offer an alternative to another popular value theory of the time.

The utility theory of value was the belief that price and value were solely based on how much "use" an individual received from a commodity. However, this theory is rejected in Smith’s work The Wealth of Nations. The famous diamond–water paradox questions this by examining the use in comparison to price of these goods. Water, while necessary for life, is far less expensive than diamonds, which have basically no use. Which value theory holds true divides economic thinkers, and is the base for many socioeconomic and political beliefs.

Silvio Gesell denied value theory in economics. He thought that value theory is useless and prevents economics from becoming science and that a currency administration guided by value theory is doomed to sterility and inactivity.

Theories

Intrinsic theory of value

According to the intrinsic theory of value (also called "theory of objective value"), intrinsic value characterizes—in terms of the value—that something has “in itself”, or “its own sake”, or “in its own right”. It is an express to a concept other than the one just discussed. It is the value that an entity has in itself as well, for what it is, or as an end. This value is not physical; saying that this value is physical is the same as saying our minds are physical. The value does not exist as an object, but is the properties of an object.

Labor theory of value

In classical economics, the labor theory of value asserts that the economic value of a good or service is determined by the total amount of socially necessary labor required to produce it. When speaking in terms of a labor theory of value, value without any qualifying adjective theoretically refers to the amount of labor necessary for the production of a marketable commodity, including the labor necessary for the development of any capital used in the production process. Both David Ricardo and Karl Marx attempted to quantify and embody all labor components in order to develop a theory of the real, or natural, price of a commodity.

In either case, what is being addressed are general prices—i.e., prices in the aggregate, not a specific price of a particular good or service in a given circumstance. Theories in either class allow for deviations when a particular price is struck in a real-world market transaction, or when a price is set in some price fixing regime.

Exchange theory of value
In Marxian economics, the exchange theory of value, is a description of the dual contrary nature of the labor contained in the commodity. The commodity has at the same time, both a subjective material use value and an objective exchange value or social value.

The use value is the value of a material by the utility, use or consumption, and in which a thing meets human needs. An example of this is if someone wants to build a wooden shed they would need a certain quantity and quality of wood and nails. Some use value takes no effort to attain, for example sunlight, or something like gravity both which humans need to survive but do not need to do anything to obtain and still have value. Other use values do require effort to attain, increasing their use value. The needs an object fulfills and the physical properties, as in the uses to which the object can be put to work on, also tie in with the use value.

Monetary theory of value

Critics of traditional Marxian economics, especially those associated with the Neue Marx-Lektüre (New Readings of Marx) such as Michael Heinrich, emphasize a monetary theory of value, where "Money is the necessary form of appearance of value (and of capital) in the sense that prices constitute the only form of appearance of the value of commodities." Similarly to the exchange theory, this theory emphasizes value as being socially determined, rather than having a physical substance.

According to this analysis, when money incorporates production into its M-C-M' circulation, it functions as capital implementing the capitalist relation and the exploitation of labor power constitutes the actual presupposition for this incorporation.

Power theory of value
Radical institutional economists Jonathan Nitzan and Shimshon Bichler (2009) argue that it was never possible to separate economics from politics. This separation is required to allow for neoclassical economics to base their theory on utility value and for Marxists to base the labour theory of value on quantified abstract labour. Instead of a utility theory of value (like neoclassical economics) or a labour theory of value (as found in Marxian economics), Nitzan and Bichler propose a power theory of value. The structure of prices has little to do with the so-called "material" sphere of production and consumption. The quantification of power in prices is not the consequence of external laws—whether natural or historical—but entirely internal to society.

In capitalism, power is the governing principle as rooted in the centrality of private ownership. Private ownership is wholly and only an act of institutionalized exclusion, and institutionalized exclusion is a matter of organized power. And since the power behind private ownership is denominated in prices, Nitzan and Bichler argue, there is a need for a power theory of value. There is, however, a causality dilemma to their argument that has drawn criticism: power is based on the ability of firms to set monopoly prices yet the ability to set prices is based on firms possessing a degree of power in the market.

Capitalization, in their theory, is a measure of power, as illuminated through the present discounted value of future earnings (while also taking into account hype and risk). This formula is basic to finance which is the overarching logic of capitalism. The logic is also inherently differential as every capitalist strives to accumulate greater earnings than their competitors (but not profit maximization). Nitzan and Bichler label this process differential accumulation. In order to have a power theory of value there needs to be differential accumulation where some owners' rate of growth of capitalization is faster than the average pace of capitalization.

Subjective theory of value and marginalism

The subjective theory of value is a theory of value that believes that an item’s value depends on the consumer. This theory states that an item’s value is not dependent on the labor that goes into a good, or any inherent property of the good. Instead, the subjective theory of value believes that a good’s value depends on the consumers wants and needs. The consumer places a value on an item by determining the marginal utility, or additional satisfaction of one additional good, of that item and deciding what that means to them.

The modern subjective theory of value was created by William Stanley Jevons, Léon Walras, and Carl Menger in the late 19th century. The subjective theory contradicted Karl Marx's labor theory which stated an item's value depends on the labour that goes into production and not the ability to satisfy the consumer.

The subjective theory of value helped answer the "diamond–water paradox," which many believed to be unsolvable. The diamond–water paradox questions why diamonds are so much more valuable than water when water is necessary for life. This paradox was answered by the subjective theory of value by realizing that water, in total, is more valuable than diamonds because the first few units are necessary for life. The key difference between water and diamonds is that water is more plentiful and diamonds are rare. Because of the availability, one additional unit of diamonds exceeds the value of one additional unit of water. The subjective theory is useful for explaining supply and demand.

Marginalism refers to the study of marginal theories and studies within economics. The topics included in marginalism are marginal utility, marginal rate of substitution, and opportunity costs. Marginalism can be applied to the subjective theory of value because the subjective theory takes into account the marginal utility of an item in order to put a value on it.

References

External links
 

 
Management cybernetics